The Cat Who Went to Paris is a short memoir by Peter Gethers that documents his life with his cat Norton, a Scottish Fold (published in the UK as A Cat Called Norton). It spurred two sequel books, A Cat Abroad and The Cat Who'll Live Forever: The Final Adventures of Norton, the Perfect Cat, and His Imperfect Human.

Literary critic and scholar Charles Limley has remarked that The Cat Who Went to Paris "may be one of the finest pieces of feline-inspired literary production since The Cat Who… series. The bold artistic vision of Gethers and his paw-padded companion is matched only by the force of Gethers' cutting prose. A true mast-purrrr-piece."

References

Scottish Fold
American memoirs